"You Stepped Into My Life" is a song released by the Bee Gees in September 1976 on the album Children of the World. It was also released as the B-side of "Love So Right". Written by Barry, Robin & Maurice Gibb.

In Canada, this song was chosen as the A-side and its flipside was "Love So Right" In Scandinavia and UK, it released as a double A side single with "Love So Right". Allmusic's Bruce Eder called this funk number as one of the "soul ballads" on the album Children of the World.

Recording
The Bee Gees started to record this song on February 3 at Criteria Studios in Miami. It was finished on May 7 after they recorded and finished "Can't Keep a Good Man Down" and "Boogie Child" the day before in Le Studio in Quebec.

Musical structure
The first parts of the song features a funky electric and bass guitar beat by Alan Kendall and Maurice Gibb and later joined by Blue Weaver through synthesizers and keyboards.

The song is all about a singer became happy when he met his lover, the singer also tells his painful memory before he met his lover, and described her touch to him as an "ecstasy".

Personnel
Barry Gibb — lead vocals, acoustic guitar
Maurice Gibb — bass guitar
Alan Kendall — electric guitar
Dennis Bryon — drums
Blue Weaver — synthesizer, keyboards

Cover versions

 Melba Moore recorded a Philly soul version of the song for her 1978 Epic Records album release Melba produced by McFadden & Whitehead with Jerry Cohen. The singer and her producers had aimed at scoring Moore a breakout hit with a Bee Gees cover and chose "You Stepped Into My Life", the group's own original version being comparatively low-profile. "You Stepped Into My Life" did afford Moore a major club hit and became the second and most successful of her two Billboard Hot 100 singles while remaining a Top 40 shortfall with a #47 peak. The track also reached #17 on the Billboard ranking of R&B singles
 Wayne Newton released his version as a single in 1979 on Aries Records; it reached #90 in the U.S.

References

1976 songs
1976 singles
Bee Gees songs
British disco songs
British funk songs
Songs written by Barry Gibb
Songs written by Robin Gibb
Songs written by Maurice Gibb
Song recordings produced by Barry Gibb
Song recordings produced by Robin Gibb
Song recordings produced by Maurice Gibb
RSO Records singles
Melba Moore songs
Epic Records singles
Song recordings produced by Albhy Galuten
Songs about drugs
Wayne Newton songs